Soufiane Guerrab (born 18 February 1987) is a French actor best known to international audiences for his role as police detective Youssef Guedira in the mystery series Lupin.

Early life
Born to [Algerian parents, Guerrab grew up in Rosny-sous-Bois, in the eastern suburbs of Paris. Before getting into acting at the age of 18, he composed music.

Career
Guerrab received his first major role in the series Les Beaux Mecs, followed by several supporting roles in the films The Measure of a Man, Dheepan, and Two Birds, One Stone. In 2017, he received the Rendez-vous Award at the Cabourg Film Festival for his role as Farid in the film Patients.
In 2018, Guerrab created the Tapis Bleu film festival, based in Rosny-sous-Bois and sponsored by poet and filmmaker Grand Corps Malade.

Since 2021, he appears in the Netflix mystery comedy series Lupin.

Filmography

Awards and nominations

References

External links
 
 Tapis Bleu film festival on rosnysousbois.fr

1987 births
Living people
French male actors
French male film actors
French male television actors
French people of Algerian descent